Julie Zeilinger (born February 24, 1993) is an American editor and feminist writer, known for having founded the feminist blog The F Bomb in 2009, and as the editor of MTV News Founders. She is the author of the book A Little F'd Up: Why Feminism is Not a Dirty Word (2012). Her work has appeared in Huffington Post, Feminist.com, Skirt Magazine, The Frisky, and Feministing.
Zeilinger was named as one of More Magazine's "What the New Feminists Look Like"  and as the Times of London's "40 Bloggers Who Really Count" and Forbes Magazine's "30 Under 30: Media" in 2016.

Background
Zeilinger was raised in Pepper Pike, Ohio. She is a graduate of Barnard College in New York City. Her book, A Little F'd Up, was published in April 2012 and released by Seal Press.

Notable blog posts
In her blog post “Technology and the Future of Feminism,” Zeilinger discusses technology and describes how online activism, specifically feminist blogging, is shaping the new feminist identity. There are three noted aspects of feminist blogging which promote feminist activism; the right for young women to have thoughts and feelings and the space to voice them online, the sense of community that it creates and encourages, and its ability to democratize the feminist movement and allow for greater inclusivity.
The ability for females to post their personal beliefs online is indeed an act of feminism. As Zeilinger points out, women are rarely encouraged to express their emotions and intelligence and are often portrayed as inferior beings. Online feminist activism outlets such as The FBomb empower women to rise above their subjugation and “refuse to buy into a culture that encourages our silence and subservience.” Feminist blogging has the ability to reach farther than previous means of feminist dialogue. Feminist views exchanged over the internet are more frequently observed and therefore allow for better understanding of feminist thought. 
The formation of an online feminist community is a propelling factor towards increased feminist activism. The internet is a wonderful facilitator of building relationships and connecting people with like-minded ideas. Critics however, argue that feminist blogging lacks eminence and does not produce substantial change. Zeilinger retorts to detractors by stating that online feminist activism with its technological basis is in fact progressive, and even without on-the-ground physical organization is still incredibly successful in garnering allies. The in the flesh aspect of activism is not an option for all women; therefore, feminist blogging allows them to stay involved in the conversation and connected with their feminist-minded peers. 
Feminist blogging allows for the feminist movement itself to evolve. Its history and key components are somewhat veiled and vast online feminist interactions help to omit previous misconceptions and allow for enhanced inclusiveness and understanding.  The democratization of the movement transpires through participation in conversations via blogs; and although there are certainly more prominent blogs and bloggers, readers are free to comment and share their thoughts. Feminist blogging has increased inclusivity, however further diversification of the feminist movement is still necessary. Zeilinger admits to agreeing with criticisms that within the current state of the feminist movement there is still room for improvement; however, she also reminds us that it is evolving and the continuation of participation in the feminist blogosphere is essential to the greater feminist movement.
The new wave of feminists are desperately searching for an innovative identity. The legacies of past generations are riddled with prejudice and condemnation and remain unrelenting issues for feminists today. With the development of the blogosphere there are many uncertainties regarding the future of the feminist movement; yet at the same time those unknowns allow for existing and future feminists to redefine and revolutionize feminist activism.

Books
 (2012). A Little F'd Up: Why Feminism is Not a Dirty Word. Seal Press. .
 (2014) "College 101: A Girl’s Guide to Freshman Year" , Publisher: Sourcebooks, Incorporated, Publication date: 4/1/2014, Pages: 200

References

External links
 Official website
 The FBomb

American bloggers
1993 births
Living people
American feminist writers
American women bloggers
Feminist bloggers
American women columnists
HuffPost writers and columnists
Barnard College alumni
Writers from Queens, New York
21st-century American essayists
21st-century American journalists
21st-century American women writers
American women essayists